Skeagh Cairn is a cairn and ring barrow and National Monument located in County Cork, Ireland.

Location
Skeagh Cairn is located 5.8 km (3.6 mi) northwest of Skibbereen. A ring barrow is located 20 m (70 ft) to the north.

History
The cairn is believed to date back to  the Neolithic. Festivals formerly took place here at midwinter.

Description

References

National Monuments in County Cork
Archaeological sites in County Cork